Vyoska is a rural locality (a village) in Simskoye Rural Settlement, Yuryev-Polsky District, Vladimir Oblast, Russia. The population was 188 as of 2010.

Geography 
Vyoska is located 18 km north of Yuryev-Polsky (the district's administrative centre) by road. Aleksino is the nearest rural locality.

References 

Rural localities in Yuryev-Polsky District